Thomas Saxton (born 3 October 1983) is an English former professional rugby league footballer who last played for the York City Knights in Kingstone Press League 1, usually as a , but also as a  or .

He has previously played for the Castleford Tigers (Heritage № 791), Hull FC, Wakefield Trinity Wildcats and the Salford City Reds in the Super League. Also he has represented England A-Team and England Academy.

Saxton played for Hull in the 2005 Challenge Cup Final from the interchange bench in their victory against the Leeds Rhinos.

He played for six seasons with the Featherstone Rovers before moving to Halifax in 2015. In November 2016 he signed for York having joined the club on-loan earlier in the year.

Genealogical information
Tommy Saxton is the brother of the rugby league footballer; Nicky Saxton, and the nephew of the rugby league footballer; Alan Banks.

References

External links
York City Knights profile
(archived by web.archive.org) Profile at featherstonerovers.net

1983 births
Living people
Castleford Tigers players
English rugby league players
Featherstone Rovers players
Halifax R.L.F.C. players
Hull F.C. players
Rugby league centres
Rugby league fullbacks
Rugby league players from Pontefract
Rugby league wingers
Salford Red Devils players
Wakefield Trinity players
York City Knights players